Alfur, Alfurs, Alfuros, Alfures, Aliforoes, Alifuru or Horaforas (in Dutch, Alfoeren) people is a broad term recorded at the time of the Portuguese seaborne empire to refer all the non-Muslim, non-Christian peoples living in inaccessible areas of the interior in the eastern portion of Maritime Southeast Asia.

Etymology

Several origins for the term Alfur have been proposed, including from Spanish, Portuguese, and even Arabic. The most likely hypothesis however is that it originated from Tidorese halefuru, a compound composed of the stems hale "land" and furu "wild, savage". From Tidore it was adopted and used by Malay traders and the Portuguese, Spanish and Dutch adventurers and colonists who came to the Spice Islands.

The term referred to certain lands and their inhabitants that were considered "wild", "untamed" or "pagan", particularly in regions that fell under the influence of Tidore and neighboring Ternate. The term was thus especially used of peoples in the Maluku Islands (Halmahera, Seram, and Buru among others) and nearby areas of northern and central Sulawesi. Until the 1900s even Papuans were also often called "Alfur". In 1879 Van Musschenbroek, former Resident of Menado, described the use of the term in the following way:

"The general native criterion whether one still is [or is no longer] an Alfur lies in the laying aside of heathenism through the adoption of a monotheistic religion, be it Christianity or Islam. There are thus Alfurs among the most diverse races, both among the Melanesian inhabitants of New Guinea and the true Polynesians of Ceram, as well as among the (Micro?)-nesian Sangirese and the Malayo-Polynesian inhabitants of Celebes."

As with the so-called Indians of South America, the various peoples collectively referred to as Alfurs were not culturally homogeneous. The term Alfur is thus generally claimed to be of no ethnological value, and shortly after the turn of the 20th century it practically disappeared from Dutch administrative and academic writings. The word "Alfuren" continued to be used by German anthropologist Georg Friederici in his works. He used it in a more specific manner to refer to the aborigines or early inhabitants of Maluku, and by extension to those from the island of Sulawesi.

Present-day use
In present-day publications like guide books "Alfur" is included as a generic name for the indigenous people living in forest areas of the larger islands of the Maluku, like Halmahera and Seram.

Culture 
Generally these people keep their traditional self-sufficient ways in matters of social organization, food and dress. The women often wear a characteristic funnel-shaped basket like a backpack.

Alfur people usually have little contact with the more urbanized society of coastal towns, which includes the transmigrasi settlers. Their chief of war was chief Ambon I  The Alfur retained a custom of headhunting until the 1940s. Currently, they were under the leadership of chief Ambuk Abah Ampalang (Alfur name).

Alfurs participated on wars such as fights with other tribes to deter enemies from attacking them. They act like soldiers and armed with machetes, knives, spears, javelin, bows and arrows and muskets for higher ranking officials. their main armour is leather armor. In some cases, Alfurs seek help from the Wemale people because they are one alliance.

The Alifuru Council claims to represent them to the Indonesian Government.

See also

Melanesians
Arafura Sea
Ambonese
Maluku Islands
Manusela
Nuaulu
Wemale
Alifuru script
Alune
Ethnic groups in Indonesia

References

External links

Robert Gordon Latham, On the Pagan (Non-Mahometan) Populations of the Indian Archipelago
Alifuru Consciousness Video
Alifuru Council

Ethnic groups in Indonesia
Malay culture
Indigenous peoples of Southeast Asia
Seram Island
Headhunting